Mansel Airport (is a former airport  south-southwest of Paine, a city in the Santiago Metropolitan Region of Chile.

Google Earth Historical Imagery (2/28/2010) shows the airport was converted to agricultural use after 2010.

The "SCMN" ICAO code has been reassigned to Mónaco Airport.

See also

Transport in Chile
List of airports in Chile

References

Defunct airports
Airports in Chile
Airports in Santiago Metropolitan Region